Andrzej Józef Pałys (born 2 January 1957) is a Polish politician. He was elected to Sejm on 25 September 2005, getting 5055 votes in 33 Kielce district as a candidate from the Polish People's Party list.

See also
Members of Polish Sejm 2005-2007

External links
Andrzej Pałys - parliamentary page - includes declarations of interest, voting record, and transcripts of speeches.

Members of the Polish Sejm 2005–2007
Polish People's Party politicians
1957 births
Living people
Members of the Polish Sejm 2007–2011